The Savannah Sabers are a team of the Women's Football Alliance which began play in 2011.  Based in Savannah, Georgia, the Sabers play their home games in Savannah at Memorial Stadium.

Season-By-Season

|-
|2011 || 1 || 7 || 0 || 3rd National Atlantic || –
|-
|2012* || 5 || 3 || 0 || 2nd WFA National 7 || –
|-
!Totals || 6 || 10 || 0
|colspan="2"| 

* = current standing

2012

Standings

Season schedule

2011

Standings

Season Schedule

External links 
 
 

Women's Football Alliance teams
American football teams in Savannah, Georgia
American football teams established in 2011
2011 establishments in Georgia (U.S. state)
Women's sports in Georgia (U.S. state)